Finn Stokkers (born 18 April 1996) is a Dutch professional footballer who plays as a striker for Go Ahead Eagles in the Eredivisie. He formerly played for Sparta Rotterdam, Fortuna Sittard, NAC Breda, and RKC Waalwijk.

Honours

Club
Sparta Rotterdam
 Eerste Divisie: 2015–16

References

External links
 
 
 Career stats & Profile - Voetbal International

1996 births
Living people
Footballers from Barendrecht
Association football forwards
Dutch footballers
Sparta Rotterdam players
Fortuna Sittard players
NAC Breda players
RKC Waalwijk players
Go Ahead Eagles players
Eredivisie players
Eerste Divisie players